Ryan de Vreede (born 1 September 1992) is a professional Dutch darts player. He plays in the Professional Darts Corporation events.

Career

PDC
De Vreede's first Professional Darts Corporation (PDC) event was the 2009 German Darts Championship where he lost 6–4 to Vincent van der Voort in the last 64. He entered Qualifying School in January 2013 in an attempt to play full-time in the PDC and almost succeeded in the third event as he reached the final round before being edged out 6–5 by Campbell Jackson. However, after all four days had been completed he had done enough to finish fifth on the Q School Order of Merit and earn a two-year tour card. In May he reached the quarter-finals of the World Youth Championship, but was beaten 6–3 by Arron Monk. De Vreede made his European Tour debut in 2014 at the Gibraltar Darts Trophy and was beaten 6–3 by Adam Hunt in the first round. He went one better at the European Darts Open by losing 6–1 to Kim Huybrechts in the second round. When Richie Burnett withdrew from the 2015 PDC World Darts Championship due to personal reasons, De Vreede received a place in the draw through the European Pro Tour Order of Merit. In his debut in the event, De Vreede played Dave Chisnall in the first round and was beaten 3–0, missing one set dart in the third.

BDO
In 2015 De Vreede won the BDO Munsterland Trophy after beating Wilco Vermeulen 8–3 in the final. He qualified for the 2016 BDO World Darts Championship as the 16th seed, and lost 3–2 to Larry Butler in the first round.

PDC
De Vreede quickly returned to the PDC in 2016 and qualified for the UK Open for the first time courtesy of one last 64 and one last 32 exits in the qualifiers. He beat Nathan Derry 6–3, Andrew Gilding 6–5 and Josh Payne 9–5 to reach the fourth round, where he was edged out 9–8 by Mensur Suljović. In the rest of the year he played in a combination of Challenge Tour and Development Tour tournaments and reached the quarter-finals of the third Development event, where he lost 4–1 to Rowby-John Rodriguez.

World Championship results

PDC
 2015: First round (lost to Dave Chisnall 0–3) (sets)

BDO/WDF
 2016: First round (lost to Larry Butler 2-3)
 2022: Third round (lost to James Hurrell 0-3)

References

External links

1992 births
Living people
Dutch darts players
British Darts Organisation players
Professional Darts Corporation former tour card holders
People from Pijnacker-Nootdorp
Sportspeople from South Holland